The Dublin Review is a quarterly magazine that publishes essays, reportage, autobiography, travel writing, criticism and fiction. It was launched in December 2000 by Brendan Barrington, who remains the editor and publisher, assisted by Nora Mahony and then Deanna Ortiz in 2013. An anthology of non-fiction pieces from the magazine, The Dublin Review Reader, appeared in 2007. The magazine has been noted for the range of its contributors, which includes new writers from Ireland and elsewhere.
In his introduction to the Reader, Brendan Barrington wrote:
"If forced to articulate a governing idea behind the magazine, I might offer this: that the essay in its various guises is every bit as much an art form as the short story or poem, and ought to be treated as such."

The magazine is presented "in book form, with minimal design, the writing presented without adornment, without any introduction, explanation of setting, background or even the usual obvious pointers to whether the piece is fiction or non-fiction". Along with The Dublin Review of Books, The Honest Ulsterman, The Stinging Fly, and various other titles, it is one of a number of periodicals to have contributed to a boom in Irish literary journals over the past decade.

Editor Brendan Barrington is also Senior Editor at Penguin Ireland, a division of the Penguin Group.

Notable contributors 

Benedict Anderson
John Banville			
Sebastian Barry
Ciarán Carson		
Amit Chaudhuri		
Anne Enright
Diarmaid Ferriter			
Roy Foster			
Seamus Heaney	
Michael Hofmann	
Kathleen Jamie		
Claire Keegan	
Derek Mahon			
Patrick McGrath		
Paul Muldoon		
Dervla Murphy		
Cees Nooteboom		
Andrew O’Hagan		
Glenn Patterson		
Tim Robinson		
Colm Tóibín

References

External links 
 The Dublin Review
 Elborough, Travis, 'The first shall be last', The Guardian (18 December 2003)
 Fuller, Graham, ‘In This Corner, a Leftist, Riling the Right Again’, New York Times (4 March 2007)
 Kenny, John, ‘Breaking the book fetish’, Irish Times (25 March 2006)
 Weiland, Matt,‘The Most Zestful Spectacle’, New York Times (21 November 2008)

English-language magazines
Literary magazines published in Ireland
Magazines established in 2000
Quarterly magazines
Mass media in Dublin (city)